Coyle is a town in Logan County, Oklahoma, United States. The population was 325 at the 2010 census, compared to the figure of 337 in 2000. It is part of the Oklahoma City metropolitan area. The town was named for William Coyle, an influential Guthrie business man.

Founded in Oklahoma Territory before statehood, Coyle initially prospered as an agricultural town and because of the arrival of the railroad. However, the demand for the area's principal crop, cotton, declined sharply after World War I. Rail service ended during the 1950s. By 2000, it was estimated that 95 percent of the employed residents commuted to work in larger towns nearby.

History
Coyle began as an agricultural community in 1899 when the Eastern Oklahoma Railway, a subsidiary of the Atchison, Topeka & Santa Fe Railway built a branch line from Guthrie to Cushing. William H. Coyle, a Guthrie entrepreneur, and U. C. Guss were employed as purchasing agents by the railroad company to acquire right of way, and were awarded an opportunity to select a townsite as a bonus for their successful work. Almost all of the Iowa City residents moved to the new location as soon as they became aware that the railroad route would bypass Iowa City. The Iowa City post office remained at the old location, while a new post office was established in the new town, which was named Coyle after its founder. The Coyle post office opened May 5, 1900. Iowa City became a ghost town even before Oklahoma Territory became part of the state of Oklahoma.

Agriculture supported the town's economy, with cotton being the main crop. Early businesses in Coyle included a bank, a blacksmith, cotton gins, a drug store, a furniture store, some general stores, a lumberyard, and a photographer. The Cimarron Valley Clipper newspaper began publication in 1900 and continued until 1949. The town had two saloons until 1904, when temperance crusader Carrie Nation visited Coyle and held a public debate with Coyle's Superintendent of Schools, Martin E. Trapp. Immediately afterward, the city government outlawed the saloons.

After WWI, the demand for cotton declined sharply, causing many local farms to become unprofitable. The population of Coyle continued to increase, reaching a peak of 440 at the 1940 census. Railroad service ended in the late 1950s. Since then, about 95 percent of the employed residents of Coyle have commuted to work in larger towns nearby, such as Stillwater, Guthrie, and Oklahoma City.

Geography
Coyle is located at  (35.954065, -97.236459). Coyle is located in North Cimarron Township of Logan County.

Demographics

As of the census of 2000, there were 337 people, 136 households, and 82 families residing in the town. There were 154 housing units at an average density of 247.3 per square mile (95.9/km2). The racial makeup of the town was 81.60% White, 10.98% African American, 5.64% Native American, 0.30% from other races, and 1.48% from two or more races. Hispanic or Latino of any race were 0.89% of the population.

There were 136 households, out of which 38.2% had children under the age of 18 living with them, 44.9% were married couples living together, 11.0% had a female householder with no husband present, and 39.0% were non-families. 35.3% of all households were made up of individuals, and 15.4% had someone living alone who was 65 years of age or older. The average household size was 2.48 and the average family size was 3.33.

In the town, the population was spread out, with 29.7% under the age of 18, 12.5% from 18 to 24, 28.5% from 25 to 44, 19.0% from 45 to 64, and 10.4% who were 65 years of age or older. The median age was 31 years. For every 100 females, there were 105.5 males. For every 100 females age 18 and over, there were 95.9 males.

The median income for a household in the town was $23,625, and the median income for a family was $32,000. Males had a median income of $21,406 versus $18,750 for females. The per capita income for the town was $13,588. About 16.3% of families and 23.9% of the population were below the poverty line, including 32.9% of those under age 18 and 24.4% of those age 65 or over.

Notes

References

External links
 Encyclopedia of Oklahoma History and Culture - Coyle

Oklahoma City metropolitan area
Towns in Logan County, Oklahoma
Towns in Oklahoma
Populated places established in 1899